Fernando Fantoni (born 24 June 1964) is a Brazilian rower. He competed in the men's coxless four event at the 1988 Summer Olympics.

References

1964 births
Living people
Brazilian male rowers
Olympic rowers of Brazil
Rowers at the 1988 Summer Olympics
Sportspeople from Porto Alegre
Brazilian sculptors